Leslee Jishawn Smith (born 17 July 1990) is a British Virgin Islands professional basketball player who most recently played for the Plymouth Raiders of the British Basketball League (BBL). He returned to the BBL but moved to the Plymouth Raiders for the 2018–19 season.

He represented the British Virgin Islands national basketball team at the 2015 FIBA CBC Championship in Road Town, British Virgin Islands.

References

External links
 ESPN profile
 Nebraska Huskers bio
 Latinbasket.com profile

1990 births
Living people
British Virgin Islands men's basketball players
Bristol Flyers players
Forwards (basketball)
Nebraska Cornhuskers men's basketball players
People from Tortola
Plymouth Raiders players
British Virgin Islands expatriate basketball people in the United States